Mony Elkaïm (7 November 1941 – 20 November 2020) was a Moroccan-Belgian psychiatrist and psychotherapist. He was a part of the anti-psychiatry movement in the 1970s.

Publications
Réseau Alternative à la psychiatrie (1977)
Formations et pratiques en thérapie familiale (1985)
Les pratiques de réseaux : santé mentale et contexte social (1987)
Si tu m’aimes, ne m’aime pas. Approche systémique et psychothérapie (1989)
La thérapie familiale en changement (1994)
Panorama des thérapies familiales
À quel psy se vouer ? Psychanalyses, psychothérapies : les principales approches (2003)
Comment survivre à sa propre famille ? (2006)
Comprendre et traiter la souffrance psychique (2007)
Entre résilience et résonance. À l’écoute des émotions (2009)
Où es-tu quand je te parle? (2014)
Vivre en couple. Plaidoyer pour une stratégie du pire (2017)

References

1941 births
2020 deaths
People from Marrakesh
Moroccan psychiatrists
Psychotherapists
Anti-psychiatry